Angus James Robson (born 19 February 1992 in Sydney) is an Australian cricketer who played in England for Leicestershire, Sussex and Durham. He is the brother of England and Middlesex opening batsman, Sam. He plays as a right-handed batsman who bowls leg breaks. He was part of the Leicestershire side that completed a famous first victory in 3 years against Essex on 3 June 2015, playing a big role in the side as an opening batsman, scoring 120 and 71 in the game.

After falling out of favour at Leicestershire, Robson left the club in April 2017, and soon found a new home at Sussex. However, after making no appearances in 2018, he signed for Kidderminster CC in the 
Birmingham and District League. In 2019 he played in four first-class matches for Durham, but was not retained on the staff at the end of the season.

References

External links
 

1992 births
English cricketers
Leicestershire cricketers
Cricketers from Sydney
English cricketers of the 21st century
Living people